Bebearia comus, the broad-banded forester, is a butterfly in the family Nymphalidae. It is found in Nigeria and Cameroon and from Equatorial Guinea to the Democratic Republic of the Congo. The habitat consists of forests.

The larvae feed on Calamus and Eremospatha species.

Subspecies
Bebearia comus comus — eastern Nigeria, Cameroon, Equatorial Guinea, Democratic Republic of the Congo: Uele, Tshopo, Equateur, Cataractes, Kasai and Sankuru
Bebearia comus retracta Hecq, 1989 — Democratic Republic of Congo: Kivu

References

Butterflies described in 1871
comus
Butterflies of Africa
Taxa named by Christopher Ward (entomologist)